Bryoerythrophyllum is a genus of mosses belonging to the family Pottiaceae. It was first described by Pan Chieh Chen and has a cosmopolitan distribution.

Species
The following species are recognised in the genus Bryoerythrophyllum:

Bryoerythrophyllum aeneum 
Bryoerythrophyllum alpigenum 
Bryoerythrophyllum alpigenum 
Bryoerythrophyllum andersonianum 
Bryoerythrophyllum angustulum 
Bryoerythrophyllum atrorubens 
Bryoerythrophyllum barbuloides 
Bryoerythrophyllum berthoanum 
Bryoerythrophyllum binnsii 
Bryoerythrophyllum bolivianum 
Bryoerythrophyllum brachystegium 
Bryoerythrophyllum byrdii 
Bryoerythrophyllum calcareum 
Bryoerythrophyllum caledonicum 
Bryoerythrophyllum campylocarpum 
Bryoerythrophyllum chimborazense 
Bryoerythrophyllum columbianum 
Bryoerythrophyllum compactum 
Bryoerythrophyllum dentatum 
Bryoerythrophyllum duellii 
Bryoerythrophyllum ferruginascens 
Bryoerythrophyllum fuscinervium 
Bryoerythrophyllum gymnostomum 
Bryoerythrophyllum gymnostomum 
Bryoerythrophyllum hostile 
Bryoerythrophyllum hostile 
Bryoerythrophyllum inaequalifolium 
Bryoerythrophyllum jamesonii 
Bryoerythrophyllum latinervium 
Bryoerythrophyllum ligulare 
Bryoerythrophyllum linearifolium 
Bryoerythrophyllum lusitanicum 
Bryoerythrophyllum machadoanum 
Bryoerythrophyllum noguchianum 
Bryoerythrophyllum obtusissimum 
Bryoerythrophyllum recurvirostrum 
Bryoerythrophyllum recurvirostrum 
Bryoerythrophyllum rotundatum 
Bryoerythrophyllum rotundatum 
Bryoerythrophyllum rubrum 
Bryoerythrophyllum rubrum 
Bryoerythrophyllum sharpii 
Bryoerythrophyllum subcaespitosum 
Bryoerythrophyllum wallichii 
Bryoerythrophyllum wallichii 
Bryoerythrophyllum yunnanense

References

Pottiaceae
Moss genera